
This is a list of places in Norway having standing links to local communities in other countries. In most cases, the association, especially when formalised by local government, is known as "town twinning" (though other terms, such as "partner towns" or "sister cities" are sometimes used instead), and while most of the places included are towns, the list also comprises villages, cities, districts, counties, etc. with similar links.

A
Ålesund

 Akureyri, Iceland
 Borgo a Mozzano, Italy
 Lahti, Finland
 Randers, Denmark
 Peterhead, Scotland, United Kingdom
 Tacoma, United States
 Västerås, Sweden

Alta

 Apatity, Russia
 Boden, Sweden
 Oulu, Finland

Aremark
 Vecpiebalga, Latvia

Arendal

 Árborg, Iceland
 Kalmar, Sweden
 Rēzekne, Latvia
 Savonlinna, Finland

Ås

 Ljungby, Sweden
 Paimio, Finland

Asker

 Eslöv, Sweden
 Garðabær, Iceland
 Jakobstad, Finland
 Rudersdal, Denmark

Askim

 Huddinge, Sweden
 Vantaa, Finland

Aurskog-Høland

 Frederikssund, Denmark
 Kumla, Sweden
 Sipoo, Finland

B
Bærum

 Frederiksberg, Denmark
 Hafnarfjörður, Iceland
 Hämeenlinna, Finland
 Tartu, Estonia
 Uppsala, Sweden

Bamble

 Akranes, Iceland
 Närpes, Finland
 Tønder, Denmark
 Västervik, Sweden

Bergen

 Aarhus, Denmark
 Gothenburg, Sweden
 Newcastle upon Tyne, England, United Kingdom
 Rostock, Germany
 Seattle, United States
 Turku, Finland

Bodø

 Jönköping, Sweden
 Kuopio, Finland
 Svendborg, Denmark
 Vyborg, Russia

D
Drammen

 Kolding, Denmark
 Lappeenranta, Finland
 Örebro, Sweden
 Stykkishólmur, Iceland

E
Eidsberg

 Brønderslev, Denmark
 Nässjö, Sweden

Eidsvoll

 Fljótsdalshérað, Iceland
 Skara, Sweden
 Sorø, Denmark

F
Fredrikstad

 Aalborg, Denmark
 Karlskoga, Sweden
 Kotka, Finland
 Norðurþing, Island
 Patzún, Guatemala
 San Martín Sacatepéquez, Guatemala
 Słupsk, Poland

Frogn

 Åmål, Sweden
 Golfo Aranci, Italy
 Kuldīga, Latvia
 Loimaa, Finland
 Mitte (Berlin), Germany
 Türi, Estonia

G
Gjøvik

 Gävle, Sweden
 Næstved, Denmark
 Rauma, Finland
 Stoughton, United States

Gol
 Bracebridge, Canada

H
Halden

 Ringsted, Denmark
 Sastamala, Finland
 Skövde, Sweden

Hamar

 Dalvíkurbyggð, Iceland
 Fargo, United States
 Greifswald, Germany
 Karmiel, Israel
 Khan Yunis, Palestine
 Lund, Sweden
 Porvoo, Finland
 Viborg, Denmark

Harstad

 Barnstaple, England, United Kingdom
 Helsingør, Denmark
 Umeå, Sweden
 Vaasa, Finland

Hemnes

 Prokuplje, Serbia
 Vännäs, Sweden

Holmestrand

 Arsuk, Greenland
 Countryside, Åland Islands, Finland
 Eiði, Faroe Islands
 Herning, Denmark
 Husby, Germany
 Kangasala, Finland
 Lazdijai, Lithuania
 Siglufjörður, Iceland
 Vänersborg, Sweden

K
Karmøy

 Häädemeeste, Estonia
 Hankasalmi, Finland
 Mjölby, Sweden

Kongsberg

 Chitose, Japan
 Espoo, Finland
 Gouda, Netherlands
 Køge, Denmark
 Kristianstad, Sweden

 Skagafjörður, Iceland

Kristiansand

 Gdynia, Poland
 Kerava, Finland
 Letchworth, England, United Kingdom
 Münster, Germany
 Orléans, France
 Rajshahi, Bangladesh

 Trollhättan, Sweden
 Walvis Bay, Namibia

Kristiansund

 Fredericia, Denmark
 Härnösand, Sweden
 Kokkola, Finland

L
Larvik

 Borlänge, Sweden
 Frederikshavn, Denmark

Lesja
 Marijampolė, Lithuania

Lier

 Falköping, Sweden
 Kokemäki, Finland
 Mariagerfjord, Denmark

Lillehammer

 Autrans-Méaudre-en-Vercors, France
 Hayward, United States
 Hørsholm, Denmark
 Leksand, Sweden
 Minamiuonuma, Japan
 Oberhof, Germany
 Oulainen, Finland

Lørenskog

 Garching bei München, Germany
 Järvenpää, Finland
 Rødovre, Denmark
 Täby, Sweden

M
Mandal

 Korsholm, Finland
 Middelfart, Denmark
 Oskarshamn, Sweden

Melhus
 Taveta, Kenya

Modum

 Laukaa, Finland
 Östra Göinge, Sweden
 Stevns, Denmark

Molde

 Bardejov, Slovakia
 Bolesławiec, Poland
 Borås, Sweden
 Česká Lípa, Czech Republic
 Mikkeli, Finland
 Vejle, Denmark

Moss

 Aguacatán, Guatemala
 Blönduós, Iceland
 Karlstad, Sweden
 Horsens, Denmark
 Nokia, Finland
 Veliky Novgorod, Russia
 Virginia Beach, United States

N
Narvik

 Kikinda, Serbia
 Kingisepp, Russia
 Kiruna, Sweden
 Nowy Sącz, Poland
 Rovaniemi, Finland

Nesodden

 Herlev, Denmark
 Höganäs, Sweden
 Lieto, Finland
 Santa Tecla, El Salvador
 Seltjarnarnes, Iceland

Nittedal

 Fredensborg, Denmark
 Håbo, Sweden
 Ingå, Finland

O
Oppdal

 Jammerbugt, Denmark
 Lindesberg, Sweden

Oppegård

 Hvidovre, Denmark
 Sollentuna, Sweden
 Tuusula, Finland

R
Rana

 Fairbanks, United States
 Petrozavodsk, Russia
 Raahe, Finland

 Skellefteå, Sweden
 Vesthimmerlands, Denmark

Ringerike

 Lohja, Finland
 Skagaströnd, Iceland
 Växjö, Sweden

S
Saltdal
 Niš, Serbia

Sande

 Akaa, Finland
 Klippan, Sweden
 Limbaži, Latvia

Sandefjord

 Haderslev, Denmark
 Uusikaupunki, Finland

Sandnes
 Labin, Croatia

Sarpsborg

 Bethlehem, Palestine
 Forssa, Finland
 Grand Forks, United States
 Södertälje, Sweden
 Struer, Denmark

Skaun

 Keuruu, Finland
 Langeland, Denmark
 Tingsryd, Sweden

Ski

 Gladsaxe, Denmark
 Pirkkala, Finland
 Solna, Sweden
 Viimsi, Estonia

Skien

 Belozersk, Russia
 Jõhvi, Estonia
 Loimaa, Finland
 Minot, United States
 Mosfellsbær, Iceland
 Onești, Romania
 Rendsburg, Germany
 Sorrento, Italy
 Thisted, Denmark
 Uddevalla, Sweden

Sortland
 Monchegorsk, Russia

Sør-Varanger

 Inari, Finland
 Pechengsky District, Russia
 Severomorsk, Russia

Stange

 Botkyrka, Sweden
 Brøndby, Denmark

Stavanger

 Aberdeen, Scotland, United Kingdom
 Antsirabe, Madagascar
 Esbjerg, Denmark
 Eskilstuna, Sweden
 Estelí, Nicaragua
 Fjarðabyggð, Iceland
 Galveston, United States
 Houston, United States
 Jyväskylä, Finland
 Nablus, Palestine
 Netanya, Israel

Stord

 Gentofte, Denmark
 Halmstad, Sweden
 Hanko, Finland

Svelvik

 Naantali, Finland
 Nordfyn, Denmark
 Vadstena, Sweden

T
Tønsberg

 Ísafjarðarbær, Iceland
 Joensuu, Finland
 Linköping, Sweden

Tromsø

 Anchorage, United States
 Gaza City, Palestine
 Kemi, Finland
 Luleå, Sweden
 Quetzaltenango, Guatemala
 Zagreb, Croatia

Trondheim

 Darmstadt, Germany
 Dunfermline, Scotland, United Kingdom
 Graz, Austria
 Klaksvík, Faroe Islands
 Kópavogur, Iceland
 Norrköping, Sweden
 Odense, Denmark
 Petah Tikva, Israel
 Ramallah, Palestine
 Split, Croatia
 Tampere, Finland
 Tiraspol, Moldova
 Vallejo, United States

Trysil

 Kil, Sweden
 Laihia, Finland

V
Vefsn

 Gornji Milanovac, Serbia
 Lycksele, Sweden

Vestby
 Vara, Sweden

References

Norway
Twin towns
Foreign relations of Norway
Populated places in Norway